Dan Maddicott is a children's television producer. He created and produced the programme Dog and Duck, as well as serving as executive producer for Fungus the Bogeyman, Captain Star and The Worst Witch. Once the Granada director of children's, he established his own production company, Indie Kids, in 2002.

External links

British television producers
Living people
Year of birth missing (living people)
Place of birth missing (living people)